Chilltown, New York is the sixth solo studio album by American rapper and producer Erick Sermon. It was released on June 22, 2004 via Def Squad/Universal Motown Records Group. Recording sessions took place at L.I.T.E. Recording Studios in Long Island, New York. Production was handled solely by Sermon. The album features guest appearances from Sy Scott, Redman, 11/29, Dahlia Anderson, Keith Murray, Khari, Slimkid3, Talib Kweli and Whip Montez. The album spawned two singles: "Relentless"/"I'm Not Him" and "Feel It".

The album peaked at number 61 on the Billboard 200 albums chart in the United States.

Critical reception

Chilltown, New York received generally positive reviews from critics. At Metacritic, which assigns a normalized rating out of 100 to reviews from mainstream publications, the album received an average score of 74, based on 8 reviews. Lee Henderson of PopMatters stated, "As strong as anything Sermon's done". Steve Juon of RapReviews praised the album saying, "Chilltown, New York proves itself a worthy successor not only to 2002's React but to the rest of Sermon's long and storied rap career". Jamin Warren of Pitchfork said, "No doubt, Chilltown consistently delivers solid hip-hop cuts. But in comparison to his 2002 release React, Sermon's well of creativity might be running dry". AllMusic reviewer Andy Kellman said, "Chilltown won't be thought of as a classic down the line, but it hardly weakens the MC/producer's reputation".

Track listing

Sample credits
Relentless
"Real Fright" by Iron Butterfly
Street Hop
"Made You Look" by Nas
Chillin'
"Top Billin'" by Audio Two
"Bring the Noise" by Public Enemy
I'm Not Him
"Bring the Noise" by Public Enemy
Feel It
"Like Glue" by Sean Paul
"Here We Go (Live)" by Run-DMC
Do You Know
Contains an interpolation of "Theme from Mahogany" by Diana Ross
Can U Hear Me Now
"AJ Scratch" by Kurtis Blow
"Bring the Noise" by Public Enemy

Chart history

References

External links
Chilltown, New York on Bandcamp

2004 albums
Erick Sermon albums
Albums produced by Erick Sermon
Motown albums